Phyllobacterium sophorae is a Gram-negative bacteria in the genus Phyllobacterium which has been isolated from the root nodules of the plant Sophora flavescens.

References

Phyllobacteriaceae
Bacteria described in 2015